Lieutenant-General Sir Euan Alfred Bews Miller KBE CB DSO MC (5 July 1897 – 30 August 1985) was a senior British Army officer who fought in both the world wars and later went on to be Military Secretary.

Military career
Euan Miller was born on 5 July 1897 and was educated at Wellington College, Berkshire and, later, at the Royal Military College, Sandhurst. He was commissioned as a second lieutenant into the King's Royal Rifle Corps (KRRC) on 17 April 1915. He served with his regiment during the First World War in France and Salonika.

He remained in the army between the wars, attending the Staff College, Camberley from 1926 to 1927, alongside fellow students such as Douglas Wimberley, Charles Hudson, Edward Williams, George Wood, John Whitaker, Noel Holmes. He became a General Staff Officer (GSO) in Northern Ireland District in 1928 and Brigade Major for Southern Command in 1930 moving on to be a General Staff Officer at the War Office in 1934 and at the Staff College, Camberley in 1936. He was promoted on 1 July 1934 to brevet major.

He served in the Second World War as a General Staff Officer at the General Headquarters of the British Expeditionary Force and then as commanding officer of the 2nd Battalion, King's Royal Rifle Corps during the Defence of Calais in 1940. He spent the remainder of the War as a prisoner of war.

After the War, he became Deputy Military Secretary and then Commander of Hanover District in Germany from 1948. He was then GOC 7th Armoured Division, before being appointed Chief of Staff at Middle East Land Forces in 1949 and Military Secretary in 1951. He retired in 1955.

In 1955 he led an inquiry into under-age soldiers in the British Army which made various recommendations in the form of a White Paper and led to higher education standards and improved training for boys destined to join the Army.

In retirement he became Lieutenant of the Tower of London.

Family
In 1926 he married Margaret Petrena Brocklebank and they went on to have one son and two daughters.

References

 

|-

1897 births
1985 deaths
British Army lieutenant generals
British Army personnel of World War I
British Army personnel of World War II
British World War II prisoners of war
Companions of the Distinguished Service Order
Companions of the Order of the Bath
Deputy Lieutenants of Kent
Graduates of the Royal Military College, Sandhurst
Graduates of the Staff College, Camberley
King's Royal Rifle Corps officers
Knights Commander of the Order of the British Empire
Lieutenants of the Tower of London
People educated at Wellington College, Berkshire
Recipients of the Military Cross
World War II prisoners of war held by Germany
Academics of the Staff College, Camberley